The Definitive Rock Collection may refer to:

 The Definitive Rock Collection (Dokken album), 2006
 The Definitive Rock Collection (White Lion album), 2007
 The Definitive Rock Collection (Faces album), 2007